The Saint Mary's Gaels men's soccer program represents Saint Mary's College of California in all NCAA Division I men's college soccer competitions. Founded in 1978, the Gaels compete in the West Coast Conference. The Gaels are coached by Adam Cooper, who has coached the program for 15 years. Saint Mary's play their home matches at Saint Mary's Stadium.

NCAA tournament results

References

External links 
 SMC Men's Soccer

 
Soccer clubs in California
1978 establishments in California
Association football clubs established in 1978